Pseudancistrus yekuana is a species of catfish in the family Loricariidae. 

P. yekuana was described in 2007 by Nathan K. Lujan (of the American Museum of Natural History), Mark H. Sabaj Pérez (of the Academy of Natural Sciences of Drexel University), and Jonathan W. Armbruster (of Auburn University) alongside another Pseudancistrus species, P. pectegenitor. Its specific epithet, yekuana, refers to the Ye'kuana people who inhabit parts of Venezuela and Brazil, including the upper Ventuari.

Distribution
It is native to South America, where it occurs in the Ventuari River upstream of a waterfall known as Salto Tencua in the state of Amazonas in Venezuela. The species is typically found in the main channel of the Ventuari, in areas with torrential sheet flow and a substrate of bedrock. It reaches 4.3 cm (1.7 inches) SL.

References 

yekuana